Germaine Sablon (19 July 1899 at Le Perreux-sur-Marne  – 17 April 1985 at Saint-Raphael) was a French singer, film actress and a WWII French Resistance fighter.

She starred in some 15 films between 1920 and 1956.

Biography 
Germaine Sablon was born into an artistic family: daughter of Charles Sablon (composer born in 1871), sister of André Sablon (composer), of Jean Sablon (popular singer) and of Marcel Sablon, (director of the Monte Carlo Ballet) and later, she became the aunt of actor Jacques Sablon.

Germaine Sablon began a career as an operetta singer in 1915.
From 1919, she played in silent films.

Married twice, in 1918 to Maurice Bloch, then in 1921 to Charles Legrand, she was for many years the companion of the writer Joseph Kessel.

She interrupted her career in the 1920s to give birth to two sons.

As early as 1932, she started recording her songs. At the same time, her career as an actress underwent a considerable turning point with the advent of talking films.

With the Fall of France in 1940, she left Paris for Saint-Raphaël. She stayed with Joseph Kessel (with whom, as noted, she would start a long relationship) and his nephew Maurice Druon. Along with André Girard and André Gillois, she joined the Resistance fight against the Nazi occupier.

In 1941 she took refuge in Switzerland, then in London in 1943.

On 30 May 1943, she sang for the first time the Chant des Partisans and recorded it for Alberto Cavalcanti's propaganda film Three Songs about Resistance.
.

Involved with Free France, in the later part of the war she was a nurse in the Hadfield-Spears Ambulance Unit and followed the 1st Free French Division in Italy and France.

From 1945 to 1955, she recorded thirty songs.

Germaine Sablon was a Chevalier (Knight) of the Legion of Honor, and a holder of the Croix de guerre 1939–1945.

Songs 
 Vous ne savez pas (duet with Jean Sablon)
 Mon légionnaire
 Mon homme
 La petite île
 Partance
 Le Chant des partisans
 Paris est à nous

Filmography 
 1920 : In La Double Existence du docteur Morart by Jacques Grétillat, she played Yvonne Saurel
 1920 : In Au-delà des lois humaines by Gaston Roudès andt Marcel Dumont, she played Lise Duclary
 1920 : In L'Envol by Pierre Hot (short film)
 1920 : In Le Mont maudit by Paul Garbagni (short film), she played Pearl Benton
 1921 : In Sans fortune by Geo Kessler
 1931 : In Un coup de téléphone by Georges Lacombe, she played Manette
 1931 : In Tante Aurélie by Henri Diamant-Berger (short film)
 1932 : In Le truc du Brésilien by Alberto Cavalcanti
 1932 : In Chassé-croisé by Maurice Diamant-Berger (short film)
 1932 : In Plaisirs défendus by Alberto Cavalcanti (short film)
 1934 : In Paris-Deauville by Jean Delannoy, she played Paulette de Sempé
 1934 : In  by Henry Wulschleger, she played Séraphine
 1934 : In Surprise partie by Marc Didier (short film)
 1936 : In La Vie parisienne (Parisian Life) by Robert Siodmak, she played The Singer
 1936 : In La Rose effeuillée by Georges Pallu
 1936 : In La Terre qui meurt, by Jean Vallée, she played Félicité
 1937 : In Au soleil de Marseille (In the Sun of Marseille) by Pierre-Jean Ducis, she played Ginette
 1937 : In Si tu reviens by Jacques Daniel-Norman she played Irène Delly
 1941 : In Sixième étage by Maurice Cloche, she played The Woman in Grey
 1943 : In Pourquoi nous combattons (Why We Fight)
 1955 : In La Foire aux femmes by Jean Stelli, she played Mme Goudart

References

External links 
 Germaine Sablon on data.bnf.fr

French film actresses
French silent film actresses
1899 births
1985 deaths
People from Val-de-Marne
20th-century French actresses
Female resistance members of World War II
Chevaliers of the Légion d'honneur
20th-century French women singers
French women in World War II